Elaeosticta is a genus of flowering plants belonging to the family Apiaceae.

Its native range is Ukraine to Central Asia and Western Himalaya.

Species:

Elaeosticta alaica 
Elaeosticta allioides 
Elaeosticta aurea 
Elaeosticta bucharica 
Elaeosticta chitralica 
Elaeosticta conica 
Elaeosticta ferganensis 
Elaeosticta glaucescens 
Elaeosticta hirtula 
Elaeosticta knorringiana 
Elaeosticta korovinii 
Elaeosticta lutea 
Elaeosticta meifolia 
Elaeosticta nodosa 
Elaeosticta paniculata 
Elaeosticta platyphylla 
Elaeosticta polycarpa 
Elaeosticta ramosissima 
Elaeosticta samarkandica 
Elaeosticta seravschanica 
Elaeosticta transcaspica 
Elaeosticta transitoria 
Elaeosticta tschimganica 
Elaeosticta ugamica 
Elaeosticta vvedenskyi

References

Apiaceae
Apiaceae genera